The Men's coxless pair competition at the 2012 Summer Olympics in London took place are at Dorney Lake which, for the purposes of the Games venue, is officially termed Eton Dorney.

Competition format

The format of the competition was determined by how many boats are competing as at the entry deadline at the beginning of July.

With 13 boats in with heats, the best boats qualify directly for the semi-finals. All other boats progress to the repechage round, which offers a second chance to qualify for the semi-finals. The best three boats in each of the two semi-finals qualify for final A, which determines places 1–6 (including the medals). Unsuccessful boats from semi-finals A/B go forward to final B, which determines places 7–12.

Schedule

All times are British Summer Time (UTC+1)

Results

Heats
First three of each heat qualify for the semifinals, remainder go to repeachge.

Heat 1

Heat 2

Heat 3

Repechage
First three qualify to the semifinals.

Semifinals
First three qualify to Final A, remainder to Final B.

Semifinal 1

Semifinal 2

Finals

Final B

Final A

References

Men's coxless pair
Men's events at the 2012 Summer Olympics